Guillermo García López (born 4 June 1983) is a Spanish former professional tennis player. He won five singles titles and achieved a career-high singles ranking of world No. 23 in February 2011.

As of 2021, he has collected thirteen wins over top-10 players, including world No. 1 Rafael Nadal in 2010, world No. 4 Andy Murray in 2012 and world No. 3 Stan Wawrinka in 2014.

Personal life 
He is named after the famed tennis player Guillermo Vilas - who his father admired greatly for his clay court dominance. He is good friends with fellow Spanish tennis player Juan Carlos Ferrero, and both train at the JC Ferrero Equelite Tennis Academy in Villena, Spain.

Professional career 
On 23 November 2009, García López achieved his then career-high singles ranking of World No. 41 after winning his first round at Austrian Open. 
During the 2009 year, he beat 11th seed Fernando Verdasco in the first round of the 2009 Western & Southern Financial Group Masters and Women's Open, also beating Mikhail Youzhny in the second round. He fell to Julien Benneteau in the third round.

At the 2010 BNP Paribas Open, he upset World No. 9 Marin Čilić in the second round. García López continued his good form into the next round by defeating 26th seed Thomaz Bellucci after losing the first set. However, he lost to Juan Mónaco in the fourth round.

At the 2010 Aegon International in Eastbourne, he reached the final, but lost to Michaël Llodra.

In the semifinals of the 2010 PTT Thailand Open, he recorded arguably the biggest win of his career, defeating World No. 1 Rafael Nadal, saving 24 of 26 break points, while converting his only opportunity to break Nadal. He then went on to take his second title (his first on hard court) with a victory over Jarkko Nieminen.

He continued his form in the 2010 Rakuten Japan Open Tennis Championships in Tokyo. He stretched his winning streak to seven by beating Rajeev Ram and Feliciano López, before falling to Viktor Troicki in the quarterfinals. 

Going into the 2010 Shanghai Rolex Masters 1000, he managed to battle fatigue with his newfound confidence, beating Eduardo Schwank, tenth seed Andy Roddick (who retired due to injury in the second set), and stunning seventh seed (and World No. 7) Tomáš Berdych to reach the quarterfinals. There, he went down against second seed and World No. 2 Novak Djokovic.

In 2012, he upset World No. 4 Andy Murray at Indian Wells in the second round.
Garcia Lopez also defeated fourth-seeded Pablo Andújar to enter the quarterfinals of the Mercedes Cup.

In January 2021, Garcia Lopez announced that he would retire after the 2021 season.

Significant finals

Grand Slam finals

Doubles: 1 (1 runner-up)

ATP career finals

Singles: 9 (5 titles, 4 runners-up)

Doubles: 9 (3 titles, 6 runners-up)

Challenger and Futures Finals

Singles: 18 (6-12)

Performance timelines

Singles

Doubles

Wins over top 10 players 
He has a  record against players who were, at the time the match was played, ranked in the top 10.

Notes

References

External links 

Garcia Lopez Recent Match Results 
Garcia Lopez World Ranking History 
Official web site

1983 births
Living people
Sportspeople from the Province of Albacete
Spanish male tennis players
Tennis players from Castilla–La Mancha
Mediterranean Games gold medalists for Spain
Mediterranean Games silver medalists for Spain
Competitors at the 2005 Mediterranean Games
Mediterranean Games medalists in tennis